Limpopo is one of the nine multi-member constituencies of the National Assembly of South Africa, the lower house of the Parliament of South Africa, the national legislature of South Africa. The constituency was established as Northern Transvaal in 1994 when the National Assembly was established by the Interim Constitution following the end of Apartheid. It was renamed Northern in 1999 and Limpopo in 2004. It is conterminous with the province of Limpopo. The constituency currently elects 19 of the 400 members of the National Assembly using the closed party-list proportional representation electoral system. At the 2019 general election it had 2,608,460 registered electors.

Electoral system
Limpopo State currently elects 19 of the 400 members of the National Assembly using the closed party-list proportional representation electoral system. Constituency seats are allocated using the largest remainder method with a Droop quota.

Election results

Summary

Detailed

2019
Results of the 2019 general election held on 8 May 2019:

The following candidates were elected:
John Bilankulu (ANC), Kate Bilankulu (ANC), Mosa Steve Chabane (ANC), Masefako Clarah Dikgale (ANC), Marshall Dlamini (EFF), Thomas Gumbu (ANC), Marubini Lourane Lubengo (ANC), Jerome Joseph Maake (ANC), Nhlagongwe Patricia Mahlo (ANC), Boitumelo Maluleke (ANC), Boy Mamabolo (ANC), Raesibe Moatshe (ANC), Fana Mokoena (EFF), Tebogo Josephine Mokwele (EFF), Patamedi Ronald Moroatshehla (ANC), Carol Mokgadi Phiri (ANC), Matodzi Mirriam Ramadwa (ANC), Albert Seabi (ANC) and Désirée van der Walt (DA).

2014
Results of the 2014 general election held on 7 May 2014:

The following candidates were elected:
Kate Bilankulu (ANC), Polly Boshielo (ANC), Pinky Kekana (ANC), Jerome Joseph Maake (ANC), Livhuhani Mabija (ANC), Moloko Stanford Armour Maila (ANC), Zondi Silence Makhubele (ANC), Thomas Makondo (ANC), Elizabeth Koena Mmanoko Masehela (ANC), Reneiloe Mashabela (EFF), Dudu Hellen Mathebe (ANC), Motswaledi Hezekiel Matlala (ANC), Choloane David Matsepe (DA), Madipoane Refiloe Moremadi Mothapo (ANC), Malusi Stanley Motimele (ANC), Thilivhali Elphus Mulaudz (EFF), Mamagase Elleck Nchabeleng (ANC) and Rembuluwani Moses Tseli (ANC).

2009
Results of the 2009 general election held on 22 April 2009:

The following candidates were elected:
Dalitha Fiki Boshigo (ANC), Letsau Nelson Diale (ANC), Tshenuwani Simon Farisani (ANC), Jerome Joseph Maake (ANC), Manana Catherine Mabuza (ANC), Willie Madisha (COPE), Zondi Silence Makhubele (ANC), Modjadji Sarah Mangena (ANC), Agnes Christin Mashishi (ANC), Dudu Hellen Mathebe (ANC), Piet Mohlamme Mathebe (ANC), Nomvula Frieda Mathibela (ANC), Divili Wilson Mavunda (ANC), Malusi Stanley Motimele (ANC), Faith Muthambi (ANC), Mamagase Elleck Nchabeleng (ANC), Mamagana Malose Anna Nyama (ANC), Maropeng Elizabeth Pilusa-Mosoane (ANC) and Désirée van der Walt (DA).

2004
Results of the 2004 general election held on 14 April 2004:

The following candidates were elected:
Richard Baloyi (ANC), Letsau Nelson Diale (ANC), Tshiwela Elida Lishivha (ANC), Thizwilondi Rejoyce Mabudafhasi (ANC), M. J. Mahlangu (ANC), Shoahlane John Maja (ANC), Frans Tlokwe Maserumule (ANC), Puleng Roseline Mashangoane (ANC), Refilwe Junior Mashigo (ANC), Nomvula Frieda Mathibela (ANC), Motswaledi Hezekiel Matlala (ANC), Mathupa Lameck Mokoena (ANC), Koena Arthur Moloto (ANC), Kgoloko Walter Morwamoche (ANC), Makwena Lydia Ngwenya (ANC), Constance Nkuna (ANC), Tinyiko Lwandlamuni Phillia Nwamitwa-Shilubana (ANC), George Phadagi (ANC), Mahwidi John Phala (ANC), Lekoba Jack Tolo (ANC) and Désirée van der Walt (DA).

1999
Results of the 1999 general election held on 2 June 1999:

1994
Results of the 1994 general election held on between 26 and 29 April 1994:

References

National Assembly constituency
National Assembly of South Africa constituencies
National Assembly of South Africa constituencies established in 1994